Mazenzele is a Flemish village in the Belgian province Flemish Brabant and also a district of the community Opwijk. Mazenzele is situated at 20 km from Brussels in the Pajottenland region. Mazenzele originated in the Frankish period as a settlement around an open village fallow. 

Kravaalbos is an old forest which is situated partly in Mazenzele. The other parts of the forest are located in Asse (Asse-ter-Heide) and Aalst (Meldert). The forest is a remnant of the ancient Coal Forest, which also included the Forêt de Soignes and the Haller forest. The forest became famous in the Middle Ages for the quarries that were exploited there from the 12th to the 16th century on the initiative of Affligem Abbey. The forest covers about 80 hectares and has an undulating relief with its highest point at 80 metres above sea level.

Populated places in Flemish Brabant